The Indian Armed Forces follow the UK/Commonwealth ranking system, and their general and flag officers use rank flags.

Indian Armed Forces

Indian Army

Indian Navy

Current rank flags (1950-2001; 2004-present)

Former rank flags (2001-2004)

Naval Ensigns

President's Colour

Indian Air Force

Current rank flags (1980-present)

Former rank flags (1950-1980) 
The former IAF rank flags were modeled on those of the Royal Air Force, with different colours.

Coast Guard

See also 

 Armed Forces Flag Day
 Indian Naval Ensign
 List of Indian flags
 Flag of India

References

External links 

 Indian Military Flags - CRW flags
 MILITARY & NAVAL FLAGS - War Flags

Military ranks of India
Military insignia
Military of India
Flags of India